Long Lake Provincial Park may refer to:

Long Lake Provincial Park (Alberta)
Long Lake Provincial Park (Nova Scotia)